Wind Tre S.p.A. (formerly H3G S.p.A.) is an Italian telecommunications company of the CK Hutchison Holdings Limited group, which offers mobile and fixed telephony services.

It began as a mobile telephone operator in 1999, with the name Andala, and was the first to offer UMTS in Italy. In 2003 the company was renamed 3 Italy, becoming part of the 3 group, and in 2016 it incorporated Wind Telecomunicazioni, changing its name a second time to Wind Tre.

Since 7 September 2018, CK Hutchison Holdings has been the sole shareholder of Wind Tre as, following approval by the European Commission, the Hong Kong group completed the acquisition of the remaining 50% of the company from VEON.

As of 2022, it is the first Italian mobile operator for SIM HUMAN, third instead after TIM and Vodafone in total active cards.

History 

The company was founded under the name Andala 3G S.p.A. in 1999 by Tiscali, Franco Bernabè and Sanpaolo IMI. In 2000, following the acquisition by Hutchison Whampoa of the majority of the company's shares, it was renamed H3G S.p.A., and in 3 March 2003 the 3 Italy brand was born.

On December 31, 2016, the project to create an equal joint venture between CK Hutchison Holdings (formerly Hutchison Whampoa and owner of 3) and VimpelCom (owner of Wind) was completed. The project envisaged the merger by incorporation of Wind Telecomunicazioni S.p.A. into H3G S.p.A., with the change of company name of H3G S.p.A. into Wind Tre S.p.A.

On 7 September 2018, VEON (formerly VimpelCom) sold its 50% stake in Wind Tre to CK Hutchison Holdings, which thus became the sole shareholder.

Despite the merger, the company kept the Wind, 3 Italy and Infostrada brands active (with the exception of Wind Business and 3 Business which became Wind Tre Business on 23 May 2017) until 16 March 2020, when the company started a process of rebranding that led to the birth of the unified brands WINDTRE, WINDTRE BUSINESS and Very Mobile (born on February 24, 2020, as a Mobile Virtual Network Operator to compete with Iliad, ho-mobile and Kena Mobile). Very Mobile was the first MVNO to market its offers also on eSIM and to experiment with VoWiFi technology.

Brands and logos

Company logos

Brands

Since March 2020

Discontinued brands and logos

Shareholder structure 
The Wind Tre group is structured as follows:

See also 
 3 (telecommunications)
 CK Hutchison Holdings
 Franco Bernabè
 Hutchison Whampoa
 Infostrada
 Sanpaolo IMI
 Tiscali
 VEON
 Very Mobile
 WIND (Italy)

References

External links 

 

Telecommunications companies of Italy
Internet service providers of Italy
Mobile phone companies of Italy
Companies based in Rome
Telecommunications companies established in 1999
Italian companies established in 1999
3 (company)
CK Hutchison Holdings
VEON
Italian brands
Joint ventures